Felpham is an electoral division of West Sussex in the United Kingdom and returns one member to sit on West Sussex County Council.

Extent
The division covers the neighbourhoods of Felpham and Flansham which form part of the urban area of Bognor Regis.

It comprises the following Arun District wards: Felpham East Ward and Felpham West Ward; and of the following civil parishes: Felpham and the southern part of Yapton.

Election results

2013 Election
Results of the election held on 2 May 2013:

2009 Election
Results of the election held on 4 June 2009:

2005 Election
Results of the election held on 5 May 2005:

References
Election Results - West Sussex County Council

External links
 West Sussex County Council
 Election Maps

Electoral Divisions of West Sussex